Celtic Football Club Women is a Scottish professional association football team, the women's section of Celtic Football Club. They play in the Scottish Women's Premier League, the top division of women's football in Scotland. They compete as Celtic FC, and are normally called the 'women's first team' within the club. In December 2018 they announced their intentions to become the first professional women's football team in Scotland with the transition completed in January 2020.

History
For the first 120 years of its existence, Celtic only fielded male football teams. In the early 1960s, Rose Reilly was noticed by a Celtic scout who wanted to sign her, but the scout found out she was female and withdrew the offer. A women's section was established in June 2007 when Celtic took over Arsenal North L.F.C., founding a Girls and Women's Football Academy at the same time.

Celtic reached the Scottish Women's Cup final in their inaugural year, losing 3–1 to Hibernian after extra time in May 2008. The team's first silverware arrived two years later as Spartans were beaten 4–1 in the final of the 2010 Scottish Women's Premier League Cup.

In October 2012 Celtic were ejected from the Scottish Women's Cup: they had tried to force the postponement of a quarter final with Glasgow City, but the SWF did not accept Celtic's reason and instead awarded the tie to Glasgow. In August 2013, Celtic faced being thrown out of the national Cup for the second successive season, following a complaint from beaten second round opponents Forfar Farmington: Celtic won the match 5–2, but had named former player Emily Thomson as a substitute in a bid to cup-tie her for the season at her new club, rivals Glasgow City.

At the end of the 2014 season, Celtic saw an exodus of established first team players and promising young prospects, with a number of players making apparent their frustration at the lack of ambition on Celtic's part, as the club had been looking to cut back their involvement in the women's game. Having already lost players of the calibre of Leanne Crichton, Jen Beattie, Christie Murray and Joanne Love, that year the likes of Gemma Fay, Rhonda Jones, Chloe Arthur and Heather Richards also headed for the exit door, while Scotland legends like Julie Fleeting and Suzanne Grant had not committed for the following season (the latter pair did both stay on, but left in 2015).

Celtic reached their second SWPL Cup final in 2017 and their third in May 2018, but were beaten by Hibernian on both occasions; the latter match at Falkirk Stadium finished 9–0, and head coach David Haley said of his beleaguered players: "I'm sure they're as embarrassed as I am". Later that month Haley stood down from first team coaching to concentrate on running the girls' academy. Former Glasgow City coach Eddie Wolecki Black was appointed from Motherwell as his replacement.

Celtic announced in December 2018 that their women's team players would be employed as full-time professionals, with the transition beginning in the 2019 season. In doing so, they became the first ever professional women's football team in Scotland. 

Among Wolecki Black's first three signings for the team was his wife, Emma Black. Wolecki Black left his position at the end of the 2019 season, with the club stating in January 2020 they would make further investment to bolster the team's now confirmed status as a fully professional operation.

Fran Alonso was appointed head coach in January 2020, having previously worked under Ronald Koeman at Everton and Mauricio Pochettino at Southampton. In June 2021, Celtic achieved their best showing in the SWPL to date by finishing in runners-up for the third time, but  by a margin of only three points to Glasgow City. This saw them qualify for the following season's Champions League for the first time; Celtic were subsequently eliminated from the Champions League at the first qualification round, losing 2–1 to Levante. In December 2021, Celtic won the SWPL Cup by defeating Glasgow City 1–0 in the final, their first trophy since winning the same competition in 2010. Caitlin Hayes scored the winning goal with a header from a Sarah Harkes free-kick, in a match that Celtic dominated and were unlucky not to score more.

Stadium and facilities
Celtic had used East Kilbride's K-Park Training Academy as their home ground since 2015.

From its inception in 2007, the team trained at the newly built Lennoxtown Training Centre outside Glasgow. In 2019, Celtic announced plans to redevelop their older Barrowfield training ground near Celtic Park for use by their youth academy and the women's team, including an indoor pitch and a matchday venue, augmenting the Lennoxtown base which would continue to be used by the men's first team squad.

In July 2021, it was announced that the Women's team (as well as the men's B-team) would play the majority of their home fixtures in 2021–22 at Airdrie's Penny Cars Stadium.

Players

Current squad

Player of the Year

Technical staff

{{Fb cs staff |bg= |p=Physiotherapist

Achievements
 Scottish Women's Premier League
 Runners-up: 2009, 2010, 2021
Scottish Cup
 Winners: 2022
 Runners-up: 2008
Scottish Premier League Cup
 Winners: 2010, 2021
 Runners-up: 2017, 2018

European History

Managers
Former Dundee United player John Holt was the team's manager in their inaugural 2007–08 campaign. Robert Docherty took charge between 2008 and 2012 and was succeeded by Peter Caulfield, who spent six months in position. David Haley was then head coach for five years until stepping down in 2018 to head the club's women's academy. Edward Gallagher, the Girls' Academy Manager was then appointed Interim 1st Team Manager. He was replaced by former Glasgow City manager Eddie Wolecki Black, who left 18 months later.

 John Holt: 2007–2008
 Robert Docherty: 2008–2012
 Peter Caulfield: 2013
 David Haley: 2013–2018
 Edward Gallagher (Interim): 2018 
 Eddie Wolecki Black: 2018–2019
 Fran Alonso: January 2020–present

See also
:Category:Celtic F.C. Women players 
 Old Firm#Women's football

References

External links
Official website
Soccerway

 
Women's football clubs in Scotland
2007 establishments in Scotland
Football clubs in Glasgow
Football in South Lanarkshire
Scottish Women's Premier League clubs
Celtic F.C.